Besnoitia is a genus of apicomplexan parasites.

Life cycle 
The life cycle of many of the species in this genus are not known. The life cycle may be complex with various intermediate hosts and  vectors including Stomoxys and Tabanidae.

Pathology and effects on the host 
Infection with these parasites causes pedunculated lesions in the skin, nasal cavity and larynx of domestic animals. The lesions consist of exophytic nodules protruding from mucosal surfaces.

See also 
Besnoitiosis

References 

Apicomplexa genera
Conoidasida